Lehmannia marginata is a species of air-breathing land slug, a terrestrial pulmonate gastropod mollusk in the family Limacidae. Sometimes classified in the genus Limax, the species is distinct in its ecology, and its nearly transparent body. It is a medium-sized species, rarely exceeding 12 cm in body length. The body is fairly long and narrow, with a marked keel. The keel looks lighter than the remaining body against the darker innards.

Distribution
This species is known to occur in a number of countries and islands including:
 Czech Republic
 Netherlands
 Slovakia
 Poland
 Ukraine
 Great Britain
 Ireland
 Norway
 Spain

Description
This is a species of keeled slug.

Ecology
This slug species is found in woodland.

In contrast to predominantly carnivorous species like the Spanish slug or the grey slug, Lehmannia marginata eats lichen, algae and mushrooms, and will only eat other dead slugs if no other food is available.

References

External links 

Fauna of the Netherlands
Limacidae
Gastropods described in 1774
Taxa named by Otto Friedrich Müller